The slang term cookie pusher has been applied to diplomats in general and members of the United States Foreign Service specifically.

Origin
The Listserv of the American Dialect Society documents "cookie pusher" as being coined by US diplomat Hugh S. Gibson in 1924.

Usage mid-century
The term has been used a number of times throughout the 20th and 21st centuries, sometimes in derogatory form but at other times in the spirit of a pseudonym for American Foreign Service Officers.  A series of articles in The Christian Science Monitor that ran in February 1950 were subtitled "Alias Cookie Pushers."  The articles were very laudatory towards the US Foreign Service, talking about the conditions encountered at the time, versus stereotypes of diplomats being "striped pants Cookie Pushers from Harvard."

Modern usage
Ivor Evans in Brewer's Dictionary of Phrase and Fable uses the term denoting a junior diplomat who functions as a roving waiter at an official reception, presumably "pushing" appetizers on people who don't really want them.

Usage in US Department of State speeches
 Former Secretary of State James F. Byrnes in his remarks to the House Appropriations Committee delivered on April 9, 1946, during hearings on the State Department's 1947 supply bill.

 Former Ambassador R. Nicholas Burns:

 State Principal Deputy Assistant Secretary Wendy Chamberlin:

 Former Deputy Secretary of State Richard Armitage:

 Former US Secretary of State Colin Powell to the U.S. Global Leadership Campaign:

 The American Foreign Service Association during possible forced assignment of officers to Iraq in 2007 (which was not finally necessary due to enough volunteers):

References

See also 
 United States Foreign Service
 Diplomacy

Diplomacy
United States Department of State
Political metaphors referring to people
Cookies
Metaphors referring to food and drink